Margaret Betts (born New York City) is an American filmmaker. Her debut feature Novitiate was nominated for the Grand Jury Prize at the Sundance Film Festival and received a Jury Award for her direction.

Background
Her father is Roland W. Betts, who had a close personal relationship with former president George W. Bush. The themes of her films are largely inspired by the social consciousness she developed through interactions with former first lady Laura Bush and the work she has done with various United Nations organizations such as UNICEF.

Career
Though she recently signed with CAA, she is also represented by Brillstein Entertainment Partners. She earned her BA in English from Princeton University, and though she was not ultimately selected, earned a coveted spot on Marvel's shortlist of potential directors for Black Widow.

Films

The Carrier 
Betts gained renown following the debut of her 2010 documentary, The Carrier, at the Tribeca Film Festival. This film was largely inspired by her experience fighting to eradicate AIDS in South Africa. The documentary was also selected for festivals such as Big Sky Documentary Film Festival (2012), Documentary Edge Film Festival (2012), One World International Film Festival (2012), Sedona Film Festival (2012), Women's Film Festival (2012), Minneapolis St. Paul Film Festival (2012), Lone Star Film Festival (2011), Zurich Film Festival (2011), The 15th Annual Docu Weeks, and Watch Docs Human Rights Film Festival (2011).

Engram 
Betts wrote and directed the film, Engram (2014), a 25-minute short film featuring Isabel Lucas and Oliver Ackland. This film focuses on the story of two elderly strangers attempting to re-discover a mutual memory as they waited to board a subway train. Betts claimed that the original inspiration for Engram was derived from the experience her mom had as a survivor of a hit-and-run accident in her youth.

Novitiate 
Betts also served as the writer and director of the film Novitiate (2017). After participation in the Sundance Film Festival in 2017, this film was nominated for the Grand Jury Prize. It explores the story of a young woman who struggles to understand her newly selected religion as she strives to become a nun.

The Burial 
Betts also served as the director of the upcoming film The Burial, starring Tommy Lee Jones, Jamie Foxx, and Jurnee Smollett.

Awards and recognition 
 Special Jury Award for Breakthrough Director (2017), Sundance Film Festival for Novitiate
 Nominated, Bingham Ray Breakthrough Director Award (2017), Gotham Awards for Novitiate

References

External links

 
 

Year of birth missing (living people)
Living people
African-American film directors
African-American screenwriters
Film directors from New York City
Filmmakers from New York (state)
Screenwriters from New York (state)
American women film directors
American women screenwriters
Princeton University alumni
Writers from New York City
21st-century African-American people
21st-century African-American women
African-American women writers